Fred C. Norton (August 19, 1928 – October 28, 2000) was a Minnesota politician, a member of the Democratic-Farmer-Labor Party, a Speaker of the Minnesota House of Representatives, and a judge of the Minnesota Court of Appeals.

Norton was born in 1928 in Minneapolis, Minnesota. He attended the University of Minnesota before graduating in 1950 from Wesleyan University. He later received his law degree from the University of Minnesota Law School.

Norton worked in the office of the Minnesota Attorney General from 1955 to 1965, specializing in tax law. He was elected to the Minnesota House of Representatives in 1966, representing St. Paul, Minnesota. He became Speaker of the House in 1980 after mid-term elections broke a deadlock in the body. He did not have the support of the majority of his caucus, but 49 Independent-Republicans joined 26 DFLers to give him the Speaker's gavel. He served only one year before being replaced by Harry A. Sieben, Jr. after the 1982 elections gave Democrats a larger majority. He later served as minority leader from 1985 to 1987, and became speaker again in January 1987.

Norton resigned from the House in June 1987, accepting an appointment to the Minnesota Court of Appeals by Governor Rudy Perpich. He won election to the court in 1988, and served on the court until he retired in 1997. He died of bone cancer in 2000.

References

External links

Speakers of the Minnesota House of Representatives

1928 births
2000 deaths
Wesleyan University alumni
Speakers of the Minnesota House of Representatives
Democratic Party members of the Minnesota House of Representatives
Minnesota Court of Appeals judges
Politicians from Minneapolis
University of Minnesota Law School alumni
20th-century American judges
Lawyers from Minneapolis
20th-century American politicians
20th-century American lawyers